Bazooka Joe is a comic strip character featured on small comics included in individually wrapped pieces of Bazooka bubble gum. He wears a black eyepatch, lending him a distinctive appearance. He is one of the more recognizable American advertising characters of the 20th century, due to worldwide distribution, and one of the few associated with a candy.

With sales of Bazooka bubble gum down, Bazooka Candy Brands announced in November 2012 that they would no longer include the comic strip in their packaging. The new wrapper would include brain teasers, instructions, and codes that could be used to unlock videos and video games. The company stated that Bazooka Joe and other characters would occasionally appear on the new packaging.

Characters and story
Bazooka Joe is joined in his various misadventures by a motley crew of characters, who came from the tradition of syndicated kid gang comic strips such as Gene Byrnes' Reg'lar Fellers and Ad Carter's Just Kids. The group includes:
Pesty (formerly Orville), Joe's younger brother, with a 1950s cowboy sombrero
Mort, a gangly boy who always wears his red turtleneck sweater pulled up over his mouth
Hungry Herman, Joe's tubby pal
Jane, Joe's girlfriend 
Tuffy, a streetwise type who wears a sailor hat
Walkie Talkie, a neighborhood mutt

The comics generally consist of soft, child-friendly jokes, as well as small advertisements for kitschy merchandise one could obtain in exchange for comics and a few cents or dollars. From the very beginning in 1954, the bottom of the comics included "fortunes" similar to those one would find in a fortune cookie, sometimes with a comedic bent.

Development
Sometime between 1952 and 1954, Woody Gelman and Ben Solomon, heads of Product Development at Topps, approached cartoonist Wesley Morse to create Bazooka Joe and his Gang. The character was named after a contest was held asking for suggestions. Morse was the original artist on Bazooka Joe.

In Heroes of the Comics: Portraits Of The Pioneering Legends of Comic Books, Drew Friedman wrote: "Gelman, along with his friend and former co-animator Ben Solomon, created Popsicle Pete, who appeared in ads and packages for Popsicle ice pops for decades. Popsicle Pete caught the eye of president of the Topps Company, Arthur Shorin, who hired Gelman and Solomon to work for him full time in Brooklyn. Gelman worked as an editor and writer for Topps, and Solomon became its art director. Gelman soon became head of the new product development department, where he developed the Bazooka Joe mini-comics (drawn by Wesley Morse) and had his hand in many successful innovations for trading cards and other products."

Bazooka Joe's style changed with the times, as with almost all 20th-century advertising characters with any sort of longevity. By the 1990s, Joe had adopted a more contemporary look, including low-slung, baggy jeans.

From 1967 to 1990, the main writer was cartoonist Jay Lynch.

Bazooka Joe comics were localized or translated for sale in other countries. For example, the Canadian version featured bilingual (simultaneous English and French) text balloons.

References

External links
 History of Bazooka Joe Comics
 Hats Off to Bazooka Joe
 Bazooka Joe Turns 50
 Bazooka Joe's Patch Explained
 Official Website

1954 comics debuts
2012 comics endings
American comics characters
Chewing gum
Child characters in comics
Comics characters introduced in 1954
Mascots introduced in 1954
Food advertising characters
Gag-a-day comics
Male characters in comics
Male characters in advertising
Child characters in advertising
Fictional characters missing an eye
Topps franchises